George Augustus Frederick Liddell (28 July 1812 – 14 December 1888) was an English cricketer. Liddell was the son of Thomas Liddell, 1st Baron Ravensworth. Educated at Eton College, Liddell later married Cecil Wellesley, daughter of Gerald Wellesley.

Liddell made his first-class debut for the Marylebone Cricket Club against the Cambridge Town Club in 1840. From 1840 to 1851, he played 18 first-class matches for the club; he scored 311 runs at a batting average of 11.10, with a single half century score of 52.

Liddell also represented Hampshire in a single first-class match in 1844, against the Marylebone Cricket Club. In addition to playing for the Marylebone Cricket Club and Hampshire, he also played first-class cricket for the Slow Bowlers (suggesting Liddell himself was a slow bowler), N Felix's XI, the Gentlemen of England and for England against Surrey in 1849.

In his overall first-class career he scored 386 runs at a batting average of 9.41, with a single half century score of 52. In the field he took 6 catches.

Liddell was also a watercolor artist.

Liddell died on 14 December 1888 at Eton, Berkshire.

References

External links
George Liddell at Cricinfo
George Liddell at CricketArchive
Matches and detailed statistics for George Liddell

1812 births
1888 deaths
Cricketers from Greater London
People educated at Eton College
English cricketers
Marylebone Cricket Club cricketers
Hampshire cricketers
Gentlemen of England cricketers
Fast v Slow cricketers
Younger sons of barons
Nicholas Felix's XI cricketers
Non-international England cricketers
Liddell family